Acacia craspedocarpa, commonly known as hop mulga or the broad-leaved mulga, is a shrub or tree in the family Fabaceae native to central parts of western Australia.

Description
It has corky bark, scurfy branchlets with resinous ribs and dark red-brown coloured new shoots. Like most Acacia species, it has phyllodes rather than true leaves. They have an orbicular to broadly obovate or oblong shape and have a rounded tip usually with three main longitudinal nerves. The pods broad and flat seed pods that form after flowering resemble the pods of the hop plant.

Distribution
It is endemic arid to semi-arid areas in the Mid West and western Goldfields regions of Western Australia, it occurs in watercourses, on floodplains, on flats, in low-lying areas and alongside rivers goring in red clay or loamy soils or on alluvium and stony red earth.

Cultivation
The ornamental medium to tall plant is available commercially and grows well drained light to heavy soils in full sun or partial shade and is drought tolerant once it is established. It will also tolerate a light frost to around  It is quite long lived and can grow well in a container.

See also
 List of Acacia species

References 

Acacias of Western Australia
craspedocarpa
Fabales of Australia
Taxa named by Ferdinand von Mueller
Plants described in 1887